The Royal North Stakes is a Canadian Thoroughbred horse race run annually since 1989 at Woodbine Racetrack in Toronto, Ontario. Held in July or early August, the Grade II sprint race is open to fillies and mares aged three and older and is run over a distance of six furlongs on turf. It currently offers a purse of $115,065.

Inaugurated in 1989 as the Royal North Handicap, it was run as a six furlong race on dirt until 1996 when it was switched to Woodbine Racetrack's E. P. Taylor turf course. In 2018, this race is upgraded from Grade III to Grade II.

Records
Speed  record: 
 1:07.39 - Ageless (2014)

Most wins:
 2 - Confessional (2000, 2001)

Most wins by an owner:
 2 - Knob Hill Stable (1993, 2003)
 2 - Frank Stronach and/or Stronach Stables (1995, 2004)
 2 - Pin Oak Stable (2000, 2001)

Most wins by a jockey:
 3 - Todd Kabel (1995, 2003, 2004)

Most wins by a trainer:
 3 - Robert P. Tiller (1990, 1997, 2013)
 3 - Mark E. Casse (2012, 2017, 2020)

Winners

See also
 List of Canadian flat horse races

References
 The Royal North Stakes at Pedigree Query
 The 2007 Royal North Stakes at the NTRA

Graded stakes races in Canada
Turf races in Canada
Sprint category horse races for fillies and mares
Recurring sporting events established in 1989
Woodbine Racetrack